Andriy Medvedev was the defending champion but lost in the quarterfinals to Marc Rosset.

Boris Becker won in the final 6–3, 7–5 against Rosset.

Seeds
A champion seed is indicated in bold text while text in italics indicates the round in which that seed was eliminated. The top eight seeds received a bye to the second round.

  Michael Stich (semifinals)
  Andriy Medvedev (quarterfinals)
  Boris Becker (champion)
  Andre Agassi (second round)
  Petr Korda (third round)
  Yevgeny Kafelnikov (semifinals)
  Marc Rosset (final)
  Patrick Rafter (quarterfinals)
  Paul Haarhuis (first round)
  Ivan Lendl (third round)
  MaliVai Washington (quarterfinals)
  Brad Gilbert (first round)
  Andrei Chesnokov (third round)
  Richard Fromberg (first round)
  Daniel Vacek (third round)
  Stefano Pescosolido (third round)

Draw

Finals

Top half

Section 1

Section 2

Bottom half

Section 3

Section 4

External links 
 1994 Volvo International draw

Singles